Stretavka is a small village and municipality in Michalovce District in the Kosice Region of eastern Slovakia.

History
In historical records the village was first mentioned in 1266.

Geography
The village lies at an altitude of 102 metres and covers an area of 4.87 km2. The municipality has a population of 185 people.

Gallery

See also
 List of municipalities and towns in Michalovce District
 List of municipalities and towns in Slovakia

External links

http://www.statistics.sk/mosmis/eng/run.html

Villages and municipalities in Michalovce District